Blueberry Hill is a 1940 song popularized by Glenn Miller and later by Fats Domino.

Blueberry Hill may also refer to:
Live on Blueberry Hill, also known as Blueberry Hill, a 1970 bootleg recording of Led Zeppelin
Blueberry Hill (1988 film), by Strathford Hamilton
Blueberry Hill, 1989 film by Robbe De Hert
Blueberry Hill (restaurant), in the St. Louis, Missouri area
Blueberry Hill (Alaska), the northernmost point of the coastal Pacific temperate rain forest located in Valdez, Alaska
Blue Berry Hill, Texas